Starfield may refer to:

 Starfield (astronomy), a set of stars visible in an arbitrarily-sized field of view
 Starfield (video game), an upcoming game by Bethesda Game Studios
 Starfield (band), a Canadian Christian music group
 Starfield (album)
 Starfield, a brand of guitars by Ibanez
 Starfield Technologies, American tech company
 Starfield, Missouri, a community in the United States
 Starfield (shopping mall), a South Korean shopping mall

See also
 Starfield simulation, a common type of Screensaver designed to resemble Interstellar travel.